Kandahar Stadium is a multi-purpose stadium in Kandahar, Afghanistan. The stadium is used mainly for association football matches.

It is sometimes called by other names such as the Kandahar Football Stadium. The stadium was built in 2011 after the entire ground was removed and replaced with new soil and artificial turf placed on top. The stadium now holds bigger sporting events.

References

Football venues in Afghanistan
Athletics (track and field) venues in Afghanistan
Multi-purpose stadiums
Buildings and structures in Kandahar
2011 establishments in Afghanistan
Sports venues completed in 2011